Seyar-e Olya or Sir-e Olya may refer to:
 Seyar-e Olya, East Azerbaijan
 Sir-e Olya, Kurdistan